Indore division is an administrative geographical unit of Madhya Pradesh state of India. Indore is the administrative headquarters of the division.  

The division consists of districts of  Indore, Barwani, Burhanpur, Dhar, Jhabua, Khandwa, Khargone and Alirajpur.

References

Divisions of Madhya Pradesh